Tedeschi Food Shops was a chain of nearly 200 convenience stores (as of March 2015), located primarily in Massachusetts, with some stores in New Hampshire. It was acquired by 7- Eleven in May 2015, and the transaction closed in August 2015. According to a spokesman for 7-Eleven, conversion of the Tedeschi-branded stores to the 7-Eleven banner will be gradual.

History

Angelo Tedeschi (pronounced tuh-DESS-key), in 1923, opened a store in the basement of the family home in Rockland, Massachusetts.  Since then, the Tedeschi family has been involved in the retail food industry, early on in the grocery store industry, and more recently in the convenience store industry.  In 1972, the Tedeschi family acquired the Curtis Compacts chain of convenience stores, which was later renamed to Tedeschi Food Shops.

Tedeschi Food Shops acquired the Lil Peach chain in 1996 and the Store 24 chain in 2002.

Angelo Tedeschi's great granddaughter is Susan Tedeschi, an accomplished musician. Susan and her husband, world renowned slide guitarist Derek Trucks, are founders of the blues rock, jam band and soul-driven group Tedeschi Trucks Band.

Notes

External links

Convenience stores of the United States
Economy of the Northeastern United States
New England
Companies based in Plymouth County, Massachusetts
Companies based in Massachusetts
Defunct retail companies of the United States
American companies established in 1923
Food and drink companies established in 1923
Retail companies established in 1923
1923 establishments in Massachusetts
2015 mergers and acquisitions